Ala ol Din-e Sofla (also Romanized as ʿAlā ol Dīn-e Soflá; also known as ʿAlāeddīn-e Soflá) is a village in Eslamabad Rural District, in the Central District of Jiroft County, Kerman Province, Iran. At the 2006 census, its population was 511, in 95 families.

References 

Populated places in Jiroft County